Edgardo Santos (born May 6, 1970 in Carolina, Puerto Rico) is a retired Puerto Rican professional boxer. As an amateur, Santos represented Puerto Rico in the light-heavyweight division (– 81 kg), winning a bronze medal at the 1995 Pan American Games in Mar del Plata, Argentina. He made his professional debut at cruiserweight level in December 2002. He lost the debut bout to Argentina's Víctor Gimenez and retired from the sport after six fights, having just one win to his name after 4 losses and a draw.

References 
 

1970 births
Living people
Cruiserweight boxers
Boxers at the 1995 Pan American Games
People from Carolina, Puerto Rico
Puerto Rican male boxers
Pan American Games bronze medalists for Puerto Rico
Pan American Games medalists in boxing
Central American and Caribbean Games silver medalists for Puerto Rico
Competitors at the 1993 Central American and Caribbean Games
Central American and Caribbean Games medalists in boxing
Medalists at the 1995 Pan American Games
20th-century Puerto Rican people